Eileen Nicole Leung Chii Lin (born 11 February 1991) is a Malaysian retired competitive swimmer, who specialised in sprint freestyle events. She represented Malaysia at the 2008 Summer Olympics, and has won a career total of three medals (two silver and one bronze) in an international competition, spanning two editions of the Southeast Asian Games (2007 and 2009).

Leung competed as a member of the Malaysian swimming squad in the women's 50 m freestyle at the 2008 Summer Olympics in Beijing. Leading up to the Games, she smashed a national record and a FINA B-cut time of 26.18 seconds at the Malaysian Open Championships in Bukit Jalil. Leung rounded out the field in heat eight out of twelve to last place and forty-eighth overall with a 26.75, just 0.57 seconds off her entry standard. Besides that, Leung has also held the 4x 100m Freestyle Relay Malaysia national records of 3.51.40 seconds.

Leung successes have earned her Sabah Most Promising Sportswomen Award in 2005, and Sabah Sport Women Award in 2008.

Personal life 
Leung was born in Kota Kinabalu, Sabah. She began swimming at the age of 4 and began her training at the age of 7. Leung was pursuing her high school at SMK Lok Yuk, Kota Kinabalu, and during the same time, she was representing the state swimmer team and won a lot of states and even national award. After her high school, Leung was invited to join the national swimming team and offer her to continue her study at National Sports School, KL, and she began to represent the country to participates in a variety of national and international competition. Leung was continuing her study at University Malaya, KL after completed her pre-u, and she was appointed as the University Malaya Swimming Team’s Coach in 2013 to 2014. Leung success graduated as the first-class honor of her Degree in Sport Management in 2016. During 2013, Leung begins her coach journey, she been appointing as a swimming team coach for Royal Selangor Golf Club and Garden International School, Kuala Lumpur. Besides that, Leung is also the founder and head coach of Trinity Swimming Academy and Swim Splash Academy.

In December 2018, she married fellow Malaysian Olympian Yu Peng Kean. The couple's first child, a daughter, was born in September 2020.

Swimming achievements 
 Pre-2008: Gold medalist and meet record holder in SUKMA year 2006; overall champion in MSSM year 2002, 2005, 2007; overall champion in National Age Group in year 2003
 2008: Competed in Olympic Games, Beijing;
 2009: Medallist in SEA Games, Vientiane; competed in World Swimming Championship, Barcelona
 2010: Competed in Asian Games, Guangzhou; competed in Commonwealth Games, New Delhi
 2011: Competed in World Summer Universiade Games, Shenzhen; medallist in SEA Games, Palembang
 2013: Competed in World Summer Universiade Games, Kazan

Honors and awards 
Personal Award

2008: Sabah Sport Women Award

2005: Sabah Most Promising Sportswomen Award

Personal Best: Malaysia National Record

2009: 4x100m Freestyle Relay 3.51.40s

2008: 50m Freestyle 26.18s

References

External links
NBC Olympics Profile

1991 births
Living people
Malaysian people of Chinese descent
Olympic swimmers of Malaysia
Swimmers at the 2008 Summer Olympics
Swimmers at the 2010 Asian Games
Malaysian female freestyle swimmers
Sportspeople from Kuala Lumpur
Southeast Asian Games medalists in swimming
Southeast Asian Games silver medalists for Malaysia
Southeast Asian Games bronze medalists for Malaysia
Competitors at the 2007 Southeast Asian Games
Competitors at the 2009 Southeast Asian Games
Asian Games competitors for Malaysia
21st-century Malaysian women